Leander is a video game for the Amiga developed by Traveller's Tales and published by Psygnosis in 1991. It was the first game developed by Traveller's Tales. The game was developed on the Amiga, then converted to the Atari ST by Philipp Wyatt for W.J.S Design. A year later it was published for the Sega Genesis as Galahad by Electronic Arts.

Plot 

The player assumes the role of the legendary knight Leander (changed in the Genesis port to Galahad, son of Lancelot) and rescue the princess Lucanna from the wizard Thanatos (Miragorn in the Genesis port, who kidnapped Lucanna in an attempt to get King Arthur to come to him).

Gameplay 
Leander collects coins through three sprawling worlds, each composed of seven levels, with which he can purchase armour, potions and new swords in a shop which appears infrequently during the game. The ultimate aim of each level is to find a certain object named at the start of a level (with instructions where to find it). When Leander finds it, he must find a portal which will lead him on to the next level. If he does not find the object, he cannot enter the portal.

Enemies encountered during the game range from dragons and elves to snakes and giant otters. At the end of each world, Leander faces a gargantuan boss, whom he must defeat to enter the next world.

Cameos from other games
In the final world, there is a secret Lemmings-styled area and the main character from The Killing Game Show appears as an enemy as well as a larger version of him.

In the game Puggsy, originally made for the Sega Mega Drive, and also published by Psygnosis, an "extra-secret" level called "Lee and Errr", which can only be accessed by working out a math equation given during the credits after completing the story game, contains the following message written in large print in the background: "Leander is Galahad on the Megadrive".

Reception

The One gave the Amiga version of Leander an overall score of 93%, calling it "classy" and "graphically amazing", making note of "additional touches" such as detailed waves, waterfalls and rain. The One praises Leander's colourful graphics, 'smooth' scrolling, and gameplay, stating that "Leander has captured the console concept perfectly ... Control over Leander quickly becomes second nature, but is sophisticated enough to allow high jumping and ladder climbing."

Anti-piracy
An anti-piracy measure was tested during development which required punching a hole into the disk with a laser. If implemented, the game would freeze and refuse to load without the punch being present.

Should the physical check be removed, the game will load fine then, but with one catch. The player will be unable to get past level four as one of the platforms needed to progress has its collision removed. Further levels have no terrain whatsoever, resulting in the player falling through the platforms. Not only this, but the damage the player deals is halved.

The copy protection method was ultimately unused.

References

External links
Leander at Lemon Amiga
Leander at Atari Mania

1991 video games
Amiga games
Atari ST games
Electronic Arts games
Psygnosis games
Sega Genesis games
Video games based on Arthurian legend
Video games based on Greek mythology
Video games scored by Matthew Simmonds
Video games scored by Tim Wright (Welsh musician)
Fantasy video games set in the Middle Ages
Single-player online games
Side-scrolling platform games
Action-adventure games
Video games developed in the United Kingdom